Marián Tomčák (born 13 July 1980) is a retired Slovak football striker.

He previously played with Inter Bratislava, MFK Ružomberok, FC Spartak Trnava and MFK Petržalka in the Slovak Superliga, and with NK Rudar Velenje in the Slovenian First League.

References

External links
 Marián Tomčák at ifotbol.com

1980 births
Living people
Slovak footballers
Association football forwards
FK Inter Bratislava players
MFK Ružomberok players
FC Spartak Trnava players
FC Petržalka players
NK Rudar Velenje players
Expatriate footballers in Slovenia
Expatriate footballers in Austria
FC DAC 1904 Dunajská Streda players
Slovak Super Liga players
SC Neusiedl 1919 players